Frank Reicher (born Franz Reicher; December 2, 1875 – January 19, 1965) was a German-born American actor, director and producer. He is best known for playing Captain Englehorn in the 1933 film King Kong.

Early life
Reicher was born in Munich, Germany, the son of actor Emanuel Reicher and Hedwig Kindermann, a popular German prima donna who was a daughter of the famous baritone August Kindermann. Reicher's parents divorced in 1881 and his mother died two years later while at Trieste. His half-sister, Hedwiga Reicher, would also become a Hollywood actor. His half-brother Ernst Reicher was popular as gentleman detective Stuart Webbs in the early German cinema of the 1910s. Frank Reicher immigrated to the States in 1899 and became a naturalized American citizen some twelve years later.

Career
Reicher made his Broadway debut the year he came to America playing Lord Tarquin in Harrison Fiske's production of Becky Sharp, a comedy by Langdon Mitchell based on William Makepeace Thackeray’s Vanity Fair. His early career was spent in legitimate theater on and off Broadway. He was head of the Brooklyn Stock Company when Jacob P. Adler performed The Merchant of Venice in Yiddish while the rest of the cast remained in English. Reicher was for a number of years affiliated with the Little Theatre on West Forty-Fourth Street as an actor and manager and would remain active on Broadway as actor, director or producer well into the 1920s. On stage, Reicher starred in such plays as the first Broadway production of Georg Kaiser's From Morning to Midnight (as the cashier), the original production of Percy MacKaye's The Scarecrow (in the title role), and the United States premiere of Leonid Andreyev's He Who Gets Slapped.

Frank Reicher is probably more familiar to modern audiences as a supporting character actor in films. He began his cinema career with an uncredited role in the 1915 film The Case for Becky and would go on to work in over two hundred motion pictures. He is probably best remembered for playing the character of Captain Englehorn in King Kong and The Son of Kong, and for his work in such films as The Secret Life of Walter Mitty (1947) and Kiss Tomorrow Goodbye (1950). His last Hollywood role was in the very first theatrical Superman movie, Superman and the Mole Men, in 1951.

Marriage
Frank Reicher married his wife Ella sometime around 1899 prior to his coming to America. Ella Reicher, a native of Oldenburg, joined him there the following year. The couple remained together until her death in 1948.

Death
Frank Reicher died at a hospital in Inglewood, California, aged 89. He was survived by his sister and a brother. His interment was at Inglewood Park Cemetery.

Filmography

Actor

 The Case of Becky (1915) as One of Dr. Emerson's Patients (uncredited)
 Wise Husbands (1921)
 Her Man o' War (1926) as Prof. Krantz
 Beau Sabreur (1928) as Gen. de Beaujolais
 Four Sons (1928) as The Schoolmaster
 The Blue Danube (1928) as Baron von Statzen
 The Masks of the Devil (1928) as Count Zellner
 Napoleon's Barber (1928, Short) as Napoleon's Barber
 Someone to Love (1928) as Simmons
 Sins of the Fathers (1928) as The Eye Specialist
 His Captive Woman (1929) as District Attorney
 Strange Cargo (1929) as Dr. Stecker
 Black Waters (1929) as Randall
 Paris Bound (1929) (uncredited)
 Her Private Affair (1929) as State's Attorney
 Mister Antonio (1929) as Milton Jorny
 The Grand Parade (1930)
 Strictly Unconventional (1930) as Duke of Brocklehurst (uncredited)
 Billy the Kid (1930) as General Lew Wallace (uncredited)
 A Lady's Morals (1930) as Italian Theater Manager (uncredited)
 Gentleman's Fate (1931) as Papa Francesco Tomasulo
 Beyond Victory (1931) as German Military Hospital Chief
 The Sin of Madelon Claudet (1931) as Arresting Detective (uncredited)
 Suicide Fleet (1931) as Holtzmann
 Mata Hari (1931) as The Cook / Spy, ordered by Andriani to commit suicide for his past failures
 A Woman Commands (1932) as The General
 The Crooked Circle (1932) as Rankin
 Scarlet Dawn (1932) as Plotsky (uncredited)
 Flesh (1932) as Warden in Germany (uncredited)
 Rasputin and the Empress (1932) as German-Language Teacher (uncredited)
 Employees' Entrance (1933) as Garfinkle
 Topaze (1933) as Dr. Stegg
 King Kong (1933) as Captain Englehorn
 A Bedtime Story (1933) as Aristide
 Jennie Gerhardt (1933) as Old Weaver (uncredited)
 Before Dawn (1933) as Joe Valerie
 Captured! (1933) as Herr Hauptman – the Adjutant
 After Tonight (1933) as Major-Medical Officer (uncredited)
 Ever in My Heart (1933) as Dr. Hoffman (uncredited)
 The Son of Kong (1933) as Captain Englehorn
 Eight Girls in a Boat (1934) as The Examiner (uncredited)
 Hi, Nellie! (1934) as Danny
 Journal of a Crime (1934) as Herr Winterstein
 No Greater Glory (1934) as Doctor
 The Countess of Monte Cristo (1934) as Police Commissioner
 The Line-Up (1934) as Abraham Schultz (uncredited)
 Let's Talk It Over (1934) as Richards
 Little Man, What Now? (1934) as Lehmann
 The World Moves On (1934) as Herr Robess (uncredited)
 Return of the Terror (1934) as Franz Reinhardt
 The Fountain (1934) as Doctor
 British Agent (1934) as Mr. X
 The Case of the Howling Dog (1934) as Dr. Carl Cooper
 I Am a Thief (1934) as Max Bolen
 Secret of the Chateau (1934) as Auctioneer
 Mills of the Gods (1934) as Barrett
 Life Returns (1935) as Dr. James
 The Casino Murder Case (1935) as Assistant Coroner (uncredited)
 Straight from the Heart (1935) as Coroner (uncredited)
 A Dog of Flanders (1935) as Herr Vanderkloot
 The Florentine Dagger (1935) as Von Stein
 Star of Midnight (1935) as Abe Ohlman (uncredited)
 Charlie Chan in Egypt (1935) as Dr. Jaipur
 Born to Gamble (1935) as Defense Attorney (uncredited)
 Rendezvous (1935) as Dr. R.A. Jackson
 Remember Last Night? (1935) as Coroner (uncredited)
 The Man Who Broke the Bank at Monte Carlo (1935) as Second Assistant Director
 The Fighting Marines (1935) as Wheeler – M-70 (uncredited)
 Kind Lady (1935) as Gustave Roubet
 The Great Impersonation (1935) as Doctor Trenk
 Magnificent Obsession (1935) as Dr. Rochard (uncredited)
 The Lone Wolf Returns (1935) as Coleman (scenes deleted)
 The Murder of Dr. Harrigan (1936) as Dr. Coate
 The Invisible Ray (1936) as Professor Meiklejohn (Mendelssohn in end credits)
 The Story of Louis Pasteur (1936) as Dr. Pfeiffer
 Sutter's Gold (1936) as Governor Felipe Vega (uncredited)
 The Country Doctor (1936) as Dr. Paul Luke
 Till We Meet Again (1936) as Colonel Von Diegel
 Murder on a Bridle Path (1936) as Dr. Peters (Gregg's)
 Under Two Flags (1936) as French General
 The Ex-Mrs. Bradford (1936) as Henry Strand – Summers' Lawyer (uncredited)
 Nobody's Fool''' (1936) as Chairman (uncredited)
 The Devil-Doll (1936) as Doctor (uncredited)
 Anthony Adverse (1936) as Coach Driver to Paris
 Girls' Dormitory (1936) as Dr. Hoffenreich
 Second Wife (1936) as Headmaster
 Star for a Night (1936) as Doctor Heimkin
 The Gorgeous Hussy (1936) as Commander of U.S.S. Constitution (uncredited)
 Old Hutch (1936) as District Attorney (uncredited)
 Along Came Love (1936) as Planetarium Lecturer
 Laughing at Trouble (1936) as Dr. Larson
 Camille (1936) as Creditor Agent (uncredited)
 Sinner Take All (1936) as Theo Drukker (uncredited)
 Under Cover of Night (1937) as Rudolph Brehmer
 The Mighty Treve (1937) as Eben McClelland
 Man of the People (1937) as Professor Robinson – Geologist (uncredited)
 Stolen Holiday (1937) as Rainer
 The Great O'Malley (1937) as Dr. Larson
 Espionage (1937) as Von Cram
 Night Key (1937) as Carl
 King of Gamblers''' (1937) as Herman (uncredited)
 The Road Back (1937) as Ernst's Father
 The Devil Is Driving (1937) as District Attorney (uncredited)
 The Emperor's Candlesticks (1937) as Pavloff
 Midnight Madonna (1937) as Vincent Long II
 West Bound Limited (1937) as Pop Martin
 The Life of Emile Zola (1937) as M. Perrenx (uncredited)
 On Such a Night (1937) as Horace Darwin
 Fit for a King (1937) as Kurtz
 Stage Door (1937) as Stage Director
 Lancer Spy (1937) as Admiral
 Heidi (1937) as Police Lieutenant (uncredited)
 45 Fathers (1937) as Prentiss (uncredited)
 Beg, Borrow or Steal (1937) as Monsieur Debillon (uncredited)
 Prescription for Romance (1937) as Jozeph
 Prison Nurse (1938) as Doctor Hartman
 Rascals (1938) as Dr. C.M. Garvey
 Three Comrades (1938) as Major – Young Soldier's Father (uncredited)
 City Streets (1938) as Dr. Ferenc Waller
 The Amazing Dr. Clitterhouse (1938) as Professor O.J. Ludwig (uncredited)
 I'll Give a Million (1938) as Prefect of Police
 Letter of Introduction (1938) as 2nd Doctor – Midtown Hospital (uncredited)
 Suez (1938) as General Changarnier
 The Storm (1938) as Officer (uncredited)
 Torchy Gets Her Man (1938) as The Professor
 The Girl Downstairs (1938) as Police Sergeant (uncredited)
 Devil's Island (1939) as President of Assize Court
 Woman Doctor (1939) as Dr. Mathews
 Society Smugglers (1939) as Jones
 Mystery of the White Room (1939) as Dr. Amos Thornton
 Never Say Die (1939) as Man in Charge of Duel (uncredited)
 Juarez (1939) as Duc de Morny (uncredited)
 Unexpected Father (1939) as Adoption Hearing Referee (uncredited)
 The Magnificent Fraud (1939) as Mendietta Garcia
 Nurse Edith Cavell (1939) as Baron Von Bissing
 Rio (1939) as Paris Banker (uncredited)
 The Escape (1939) as Dr. Shumaker
 Sabotage (1939) as George Wallner—Head of Saboteurs (uncredited)
 Ninotchka (1939) as Soviet Lawyer (uncredited)
 Our Neighbors – The Carters (1939) as Dr. Proser
 South of the Border (1939) as Don Diego Mendoza
 Everything Happens at Night (1939) as Pharmacist
 Dr. Ehrlich's Magic Bullet (1940) as Old Man (uncredited)
 Dr. Cyclops (1940) as Professor Kendall
 Typhoon (1940) as Doctor
 All This, and Heaven Too (1940) as Police Official (uncredited)
 The Lady in Question (1940) as President
 South to Karanga (1940) as Dr. Greenleaf
 The Man I Married (1940) as Friehof
 Sky Murder (1940) as Dr. Crattan
 Four Mothers (1941) as Festival Committee Member (uncredited)
 The Face Behind the Mask (1941) as Dr. Ronald Cheever (uncredited)
 Flight from Destiny (1941) as Edvaard Kreindling
 They Dare Not Love (1941) as German Captain (uncredited)
 The Nurse's Secret (1941) as Mr. Henderson
 Shining Victory (1941) as Dr. Esterhazy
 Underground (1941) as Professor Baumer
 Father Takes a Wife (1941) as Captain of the 'SS Leslie C.' (uncredited)
 One Foot in Heaven (1941) as Board Member (uncredited)
 Dangerously They Live (1941) as Jarvis
 Nazi Agent (1942) as Fritz
 To Be or Not to Be (1942) as Polish Official (uncredited)
 The Mystery of Marie Roget (1942) as Magistrate
 Beyond the Blue Horizon (1942) as Sneath
 I Married an Angel (1942) as Driver (uncredited)
 The Gay Sisters (1942) as Dr. Thomas Bigelow
 Secret Enemies (1942) as Henry Bremmer
 Night Monster (1942) as Dr. Timmons
 The Mummy's Tomb (1942) as Professor Matthew Norman
 Scattergood Survives a Murder (1942) as Thaddeus Quentin
 The Purple V (1943) as Bit Role (uncredited)
 Hangmen Also Die! (1943) as Interpreter (uncredited)
 Mission to Moscow (1943) as General von Koestrich – German ambassador (uncredited)
 Above Suspicion (1943) as Colonel Gerold (uncredited)
 Yanks Ahoy (1943) as German (uncredited)
 Background to Danger (1943) as Rudick – the Assassin (uncredited)
 Bomber's Moon (1943) as Dr. Hartman
 Watch on the Rhine (1943) as Admiral (uncredited)
 The Song of Bernadette (1943) as Dr. St. Cyr (uncredited)
 Tornado (1943) as Old Man Linden (uncredited)
 Captain America (1944, Serial) as Lyman [Ch. 1]
 In Our Time (1944) as Baron Jarski (uncredited)
 Address Unknown (1944) as Professor Schmidt
 The Hitler Gang (1944) as The Justizminister (uncredited)
 The Adventures of Mark Twain (1944) as Doctor in Elmira (uncredited)
 Gildersleeve's Ghost (1944) as Dr. John Wells
 The Mummy's Ghost (1944) as Professor Matthew Norman
 The Conspirators (1944) as Casino Attendant (uncredited)
 House of Frankenstein (1944) as Ullman
 The Big Bonanza (1944) as Dr. Ballou
 The Jade Mask (1945) as Harper
 Hotel Berlin (1945) as Fritz (uncredited)
 A Medal for Benny (1945) as Father Bly (uncredited)
 Blonde Ransom (1945) as Judge
 Rhapsody in Blue (1945) as Guest (uncredited)
 Voice of the Whistler (1945) as Dr. Rose (uncredited)
 The Tiger Woman (1945) as Coroner
 The Strange Mr. Gregory (1945) as Riker, the Butler
 A Guy Could Change (1946) as Doctor (uncredited)
 The Shadow Returns (1946) as Michael Hasdon
 Song of Arizona (1946) as Doctor (uncredited)
 My Pal Trigger (1946) as Judge J.E. Ellis (uncredited)
 Sister Kenny (1946) as Dr. Chuter (uncredited)
 Home in Oklahoma (1946) as Jason Cragmyle
 Mr. District Attorney (1947) as Peter Lantz (uncredited)
 Yankee Fakir (1947) as Banker H.W. Randall
 Monsieur Verdoux (1947) as Doctor (uncredited)
 Violence (1947) as Pop
 The Secret Life of Walter Mitty (1947) as Karl Maasdam
 Song of Love (1947) as Mr. Fuerbach (uncredited)
 Escape Me Never (1947) as The Minister
 Joe Palooka in Fighting Mad (1948) as Dr. MacKenzie
 Carson City Raiders (1948) as Razor the Barber
 I, Jane Doe (1948) as Doctor (uncredited)
 The Gallant Blade (1948) as Major (uncredited)
 Barbary Pirate (1949) as Cathcart
 Samson and Delilah (1949) as Village Barber
 The Arizona Cowboy (1950) as Major Sheridan
 Cargo to Capetown (1950) as Judge Van Meeger (uncredited)
 Kiss Tomorrow Goodbye (1950) as 'Doc' Darius Green
 The Lady and the Bandit (1951) as Count Eckhardt
 Superman and the Mole Men (1951) as Hospital Superintendent (final film role)

Director
 The Secret Sin (1915)
 The Case of Becky (1915)
 Alien Souls (1916)
 The Storm (1916)
 Public Opinion (1916)
 Lost and Won (1917)
 Castles for Two (1917)
 An American Widow (1917)
 The Claim (1918)
 Treasure of the Sea (1918)
 Behind Masks (1921)

References

External links
 
 
 
 

1875 births
1965 deaths
German male stage actors
German male film actors
German male silent film actors
American male film actors
Emigrants from the German Empire to the United States
20th-century German male actors
RKO Pictures contract players